Daphnis placida is a moth of the  family Sphingidae.

Distribution 
It is known from Thailand, Malaysia, Indonesia (including Borneo), the Solomon Islands and the northern half of Australia.

Description 
The wingspan is about 60 mm. Adults have a complex pattern of light and dark brown on the wings and a white bar across the first abdominal segment. The outer margin of the forewing is more obviously excavated below the apex than in other Daphnis species.

The larvae have been recorded feeding on Alstonia constricta, Neisosperma kilneri and Tabernaemontana angustisepala. They are green with a pale stripe along each side of the back. There are some yellow markings on each side of the thorax. The caterpillar often has an “S” shaped reddish tail spine.

Subspecies
Daphnis placida placida 
Daphnis placida salomonis Rothschild & Jordan, 1906 (Solomon Islands)

References

Daphnis (moth)
Moths described in 1856